The Flying Inn is a novel by G. K. Chesterton, first published in 1914.  It is set in a future England where the temperance movement has allowed a bizarre form of "Progressive" Islam to dominate the political and social life of the country.  Because of this, alcohol sales to the poor are effectively prohibited, while the rich can get alcoholic drinks "under a medical certificate".  The plot centres on the adventures of  Humphrey Pumph (see also the Humphrey pump) and Captain Patrick Dalroy, who roam the country in their cart with a barrel of rum in an attempt to evade Prohibition, exploiting loopholes in the law to temporarily prevent the police taking action against them. Eventually the heroes and their followers foil an attempted coup by an Islamic military force.

The novel includes the poem, The Rolling English Road. The poem was first published under the title A Song of Temperance Reform in the New Witness in 1913.

References

External links
  
Internet Archive version
Google Books version (full view)
 
Iain Benson(ed)"The Collected Works of G.K. Chesterton"

1914 British novels
1914 speculative fiction novels
Picaresque novels
Novels by G. K. Chesterton
Methuen Publishing books
John Lane (publisher) books
Works about Islamism
Islam in fiction